Jesús Reynaldo (born 22 May 1954) is a Bolivian footballer. He played in five matches for the Bolivia national football team from 1979 to 1981. He was also part of Bolivia's squad for the 1979 Copa América tournament.

References

External links
 

1954 births
Living people
Bolivian footballers
Bolivia international footballers
Association football forwards
People from Trinidad, Bolivia
Club Blooming managers